Live in a Dive is a live album by Californian punk rock band Bracket, released on Fat Wreck Chords as the second installment of the labels Live in a Dive series on February 26, 2002.  The performance was recorded on August 14, 1999 when the band appeared in support of Tilt at Bottom of the Hill in San Francisco, California.

The set included material from all of Brackets' previous albums, as well as songs from E is for Everything on Fat Wreck Chords.  Several tracks are different from their studio version counterpart.  "Warren's Song, Pt. 8" (which appeared on Short Music for Short People) features a lengthy musical introduction, while "2RAK005" is played at mid-tempo pace compared to its original version.  The song "2RAK005" is featured on the soundtrack to Tony Hawk's Underground.  The studio version of "Hearing Aid" can be found on Live Fat, Die Young.  "Parade" had not yet been released at the time of the performance but would see release the following year on When All Else Fails.

Track listing
All songs written and composed by Bracket.
"Trailer Park" – 3:14      
"Green Apples" – 2:11      
"Hearing Aid" – 3:19      
"Warren's Song, Pt. 8" – 1:44      
"Huge Balloon" – 2:33      
"Talk Show" – 3:45     
"Warren's Song, Pt. 2" – 2:47      
"Hermit" – 4:36
"Happy to Be Sad" – 2:00      
"Circus Act" – 4:29   
"Back to Allentown" – 3:12      
"J. Weed" – 3:11      
"Sour" – 2:32      
"Lazy" – 3:34      
"Parade" – 2:16      
"2RAK005" – 2:35      
"Rod's Post" – 2:54

Personnel
 Marty Gregori – vocals, guitar
 Angelo Celli – guitar, vocals
 Zack Charlos – bass, vocals
 Ray Castro – drums
 Ryan Greene – producer
 Adam Krammer – engineer
 Winni Hines – photography
 Rick Hines – photography
 John Estes – cover art, comic book art
 Kevin Cross – cover art, comic book art
 Rick Remender – cover art

External links
 Fat Wreck Chords album page

2002 live albums
Bracket (band) live albums
Fat Wreck Chords Live in a Dive series
Albums produced by Ryan Greene